Durch die Nacht mit ... (Into the Night with ...) is a German documentary film television series produced by ZDF for Franco-German television channel ARTE. Locations are mainly in France or Germany.

The title of the French version is Au cœur de la nuit.

Two celebrities spend a filmed evening together. One of them is the host who sets the location and the program. There is no moderator.

See also
List of German television series

References

External links

Homepage (German/French)

2010s German television series
2002 German television series debuts
German-language television shows
French-language television shows
English-language television shows